Universal Consciousness is the fifth solo album by Alice Coltrane. It was recorded from April to June, 1971, in New York City and at the Coltrane home studios in Dix Hills, New York, and was released later that year by Impulse! Records. On the album, Coltrane appears on harp and organ, and is joined by bassist Jimmy Garrison, drummers Jack DeJohnette, Rashied Ali, and Clifford Jarvis, and, on three tracks, a quartet of violins playing parts arranged by Ornette Coleman. It was the first in a series of three albums (preceding World Galaxy and Lord of Lords) on which Coltrane appeared with an ensemble of strings.

Universal Consciousness was recorded shortly after Coltrane returned from a trip to India, and was the first album on which she is heard playing the Wurlitzer organ. In an interview, she related her decision to use the instrument to her interest in Indian music, comparing its sound to that of the harmonium and tambura. Her introduction to the organ also marked a turning point in her outlook as a musician; referring to the fact that the instrument has "two or three manuals and complete bass in the pedals," she recalled: "when I began to play the organ, there came the freedom and understanding that I would never have to depend on anyone else musically."

In 2011, Impulse! reissued the album, along with Lord of Lords, as part of a compilation titled Universal Consciousness/Lord of Lords.

Reception

In a review for AllMusic, Thom Jurek wrote: "This is art of the highest order, conceived by a brilliant mind, poetically presented in exquisite collaboration by divinely inspired musicians and humbly offered as a gift to listeners. It is a true masterpiece".

The authors of The Penguin Guide to Jazz Recordings called the album "perhaps her finest achievement on record," and described her harp and organ playing as "superlative." They stated: "the personnels reflect quite distinct musical approaches and Alice Coltrane's conviction that every piece of music had its own sufficient orchestra."

Bill Shoemaker of Jazz Times described Universal Consciousness as "an enduring album and arguably Alice Coltrane's masterpiece," calling her debut on organ "stunning," and noting how the instrument "accentuates the Bud Powell-inspired chops" and "immaculate articulation."

Matthew Fiander of PopMatters commented: "The album is a beautiful, if challenging, sound, one that seems to carry all of Alice Coltrane’s musical interests and her devotion to faith and to her husband's memory, and the results are jarring but joyous."

The Vinyl District's Joseph Neff called the album "a truly extraordinary record," and praised its "assurance, lucidity, and mastery of scale and instrumentation." He noted that the omission of horns is more than outweighed by the presence of "an exceptional band," and by the "spaced-out edginess of Coltrane's organ."

Writing for Red Bull Music Academy, Britt Robson described the album as "arguably the masterpiece of her commercial recording career," and wrote that it "anticipates the 'world music' movement by more than a decade. It is a bountiful blend of a symbolically omnificent organ that absorbs the traditions of the Black church and Indian chanting rituals."

Track listing 
"Universal Consciousness" – 5:06
"Battle at Armageddon" – 7:20
"O Allah" – 5:00
"Hare Krishna" – 8:14
"Sita Ram" – 4:47
"The Ankh of Amen-Ra" – 6:09

Recorded at A&R Recording, New York City and/or at the Coltrane Studio, Dix Hills, New York

Personnel 

 Alice Coltrane — harp, organ
 Jimmy Garrison — bass (1, 3, 4, 5)
 Jack DeJohnette — drums  (1, 3, 4)
 Clifford Jarvis — drums (4, 5), percussion (4)
 Rashied Ali — drums (2, 6), wind chimes (6)
 Tulsi — tanpura (4, 5)
 John Blair, Julius Brand, Leroy Jenkins, Joan Kalisch — violin (1, 3, 4)

String arrangements on tracks 1, 3 and 4 by Alice Coltrane.
Tracks 4 and 5 arranged by Alice Coltrane.
Transcriptions on tracks 1, 3 and 4 by Ornette Coleman

Producers: Alice Coltrane & Ed Michel.
Engineers at Dix Hills: W. Barneke and Roy Musgnug.
Engineer at A&R: Tony May.
Mixed by Tony May and Ed Michel.

References

External links
 The Wire's100 Records That Set The World On Fire (When No One Was Listening)
 Alice Coltrane Discography

1971 albums
Alice Coltrane albums
Albums produced by Alice Coltrane